Palang Gerd (also Romanized as Palangerd; also known as Palangird, Palangrād, and Payān Gerd) is a village in Homeyl Rural District, Homeyl District, Eslamabad-e Gharb County, Kermanshah Province, Iran. At the 2006 census, its population was 634, in 144 families.

References 

Populated places in Eslamabad-e Gharb County